Sage Jamen Rosenfels (born March 6, 1978) is a former American football quarterback. He played college football at Iowa State. He was then drafted by the Washington Redskins in the fourth round of the 2001 NFL Draft. He played with the Miami Dolphins from 2002 to 2005, the Houston Texans from 2006 to 2008, the Vikings in 2009, and the New York Giants in 2010. He spent portions of the 2011 season with the Vikings and Dolphins, after being released by the Giants during preseason. Through 2010, he had completed 351-of-562 passes for 4,156 yards, 30 touchdowns, and 29 interceptions, and had a career 81.2 quarterback rating.

Early years
Rosenfels was born just outside Maquoketa, Iowa, a town of approximately 6,000, to a Jewish father and a gentile mother.  He was the fourth of five children.

He attended Maquoketa Community High School, where he was a letterman in football, basketball, baseball, tennis, and track, as well as a member of the National Honor Society.

In football, he played quarterback, defensive back, punter, and kicker. As a senior, he was a first team All-District selection, was named as an All-Eastern Iowa selection by the Quad City Times and the Dubuque Telegraph Herald, and was honored as a second team Class 3-A All-State defensive back by the Des Moines Register.  His senior year, he threw for 1,150 yards and 10 touchdowns.

In basketball, he was a three-year letterman. As a junior, he was an All-State Honorable Mention selection. As a senior, he named as an All-Eastern Iowa selection by the Quad City Times, and was an All-State selection. In baseball, playing third base, he was twice named as an All-District selection, was a two-time All-Conference selection, and was a two-time All-State selection. In tennis, he was a four-year letterman. In the only season he competed in track, Rosenfels was a member of the 4x200-meter relay team which placed at the State Championships. He graduated from Maquoketa High School in 1996.

College career
Rosenfels was a two-year starter at Iowa State University.  During the 2000 season, Rosenfels led the Cyclones to an 8–3 regular season mark, and a trip to the Insight.com Bowl in Phoenix, Arizona.  He led his team to key wins versus Iowa, Missouri, Kansas, Oklahoma State, and Colorado where he had more than 100 rushing yards.

The Cyclones defeated the University of Pittsburgh in the bowl game, and Rosenfels (23–34; 308 yards; 2 touchdowns) was named Offensive MVP.  He was also named Offensive MVP of the Cyclones for the 2000 season.  The win against Pittsburgh was the first bowl victory in Iowa State's 108-year football history.

Rosenfels graduated from Iowa State University in December 2000 with a BA degree in marketing. National Football Scouting Inc., a combine services that analyzed college players for NFL teams, rated Rosenfels the second-best NFL prospect among senior quarterbacks.

Statistics

Professional career

Washington Redskins (2001)
Rosenfels, selected by the Washington Redskins in the fourth round of the 2001 NFL Draft, spent one season as the team's third-string quarterback.

First stint with Miami Dolphins (2002–05)
He was acquired by the Miami Dolphins on August 22, 2002, in exchange for a 2003 seventh round draft pick. In 2004 he threw a touchdown pass for 76 yards, which tied for the 8th-longest pass of the year in the NFL.

In 2005, Rosenfels led Miami's biggest comeback since 1974, when he entered their Week 13 game against the Buffalo Bills. After Gus Frerotte was sidelined by a concussion in the third quarter, Rosenfels entered the game with the Dolphins trailing 23–3. Rosenfels led the team on three fourth-quarter scoring drives, as he threw for 272 yards and 2 touchdowns, as they beat the Bills, 24–23.

Two weeks later, Rosenfels entered the game at halftime versus the New York Jets with the score tied 10–10, and led them on two scoring drives to get the win 24–20.

Houston Texans (2006–08)
He signed with the Houston Texans as an unrestricted free agent on March 13, 2006.

In 2006, the Houston Texans trailed the Tennessee Titans 21–3 before he threw three second-half touchdown passes to cut the lead to 28–22 as time ended the comeback.

The Sporting News''' February 2007 off-season awards issue predicted that Sage would be 2007's Tony Romo, the breakout quarterback of the year coming from a backup role.

In 2007, the Houston Texans trailed the Tennessee Titans 32–7 entering the fourth quarter.  Rosenfels tied an NFL record by throwing four 4th-quarter touchdown passes, to give the Texans a 36–35 lead before Rob Bironas kicked his NFL-record 8th field goal to give the Titans a 38–36 win.  Rosenfels finished the 2007 season at 4–1 as a starter, in comparison to Matt Schaub's 4–7 on the season.  He completed 154-of-240 passes for 1,684 yards and 15 touchdowns.  His passing touchdown percentage of 6.3% was fourth-best in the NFL for the season, and his pass completion percentage of 64.2% was the 10th-best in the NFL.

In 2008, Rosenfels started in the Texans' home opener against the Indianapolis Colts. Although Rosenfels had led the team to a 27–10 lead with 8:18 remaining, Indianapolis scored a touchdown to make the score 27–17 with 4:04 left. After Rosenfels fumbled twice the Colts took the lead and, following a last-minute Rosenfels interception, finished the game with a 31–27 victory.

Rosenfels got his first win as a starter in 2008 in a November game against the Cleveland Browns.  His second win of the season came against the Jacksonville Jaguars in the Houston Texans' first ever Monday Night Football appearance.

In his three seasons with the Texans, Rosenfels went 6–4 as a starter.  Through the 2008 season, he had thrown 30 career touchdown passes.

First stint with Minnesota Vikings (2009)
Rosenfels was acquired from the Texans by the Minnesota Vikings on February 27, 2009. In exchange, the Texans received a fourth-round pick in the 2009 NFL Draft. After failing to negotiate the rights to No. 18 from wide receiver Sidney Rice, Rosenfels decided to wear No. 2 because he had two children named Peyton and Ava and his favorite band is U2.  Rosenfels was originally supposed to battle Tarvaris Jackson for the starting spot, but his role changed to third-string quarterback after Brett Favre was signed.

New York Giants (2010–11)

On September 3, 2010, Rosenfels was traded, along with RB Darius Reynaud, to the New York Giants.  He was Eli Manning's backup throughout the season, and also was the team's holder for field goals and extra points. His only action at quarterback was in the 4th quarter of a victory at Seattle.

In 2011, in his one preseason game he completed 13 of 19 passes, for 129 yards, even though he played with strep throat.  He missed most of the pre-season and on September 3 was placed on injured reserve when he contracted bacteremia.  On October 4, he was released with an injury settlement. At the time, he had a career 81.2 quarterback rating.

Second stint with Miami Dolphins (2011)
On October 6, 2011, Rosenfels signed a one-year deal for $970,000 with the Miami Dolphins after a season-ending injury to Chad Henne.  The Dolphins chose Rosenfels after also working out Kellen Clemens, J. P. Losman, Brett Ratliff, Jim Sorgi, and Charlie Frye. Rosenfels was placed on the reserve/non-football illness list on October 25. He was waived from the list on December 1.

Second stint with Minnesota Vikings (2011–12)
The Minnesota Vikings claimed Rosenfels off waivers on December 2, 2011.  On August 31, 2012, as the Vikings reduced their roster down to league maximum of 53 players, he was released.

NFL career statistics

Source: NFL.com

Post-NFL
Rosenfels is a writing contributor for The Athletic Minnesota and theScore.com. He also serves as a color analyst for Iowa State games on Cyclones TV and a radio host for ESPN 1500 in Minnesota. In 2018, he joined the cast of Late Night Tailgate a touring sports discussion and comedy show produced by MBM Entertainment,  The Kicker and IMG Artists. As part of this tour, Rosenfels made both his standup comedy as well as his singing debut at Irving Arts Center on October 10, 2018. His a capella performance of I Will Always Love You,'' written by Dolly Parton and later recorded by Whitney Houston was captured on film by the Irving Community Television Network.

See also
List of select Jewish football players

References

External links
Sports Illustrated profile

1978 births
Living people
21st-century American Jews
American football quarterbacks
Houston Texans players
Iowa State Cyclones football players
Jewish American sportspeople
Miami Dolphins players
Minnesota Vikings players
New York Giants players
People from Maquoketa, Iowa
Players of American football from Iowa
Washington Redskins players